Wainuioru is small rural settlement in Wellington Region, New Zealand, just east of Masterton and north of Wainuioru River.

The settlement has a town hall and volunteer fire station.

The settlement has two heritage sites:

 Brancepeth is a colonial homestead and garden, still owned by the Beetham family who settled on the land in 1856. By 1900 Brancepeth was one of the largest sheep stations in New Zealand. At its height, it included an on-site library and school and more than 300 staff.

Te Parae Homestead was designed and built in 1905 by Guy and Eileen Williams, the homestead is now owned and run by their great granddaughter Angela Irving. The property has remained in the Williams family since it began in 1857 and plays an important role in the history of the Wairarapa. Te Parae was originally part of the Beetham owned Brancepeth Station with farmland totalling 70,000 acres.

Demographics
Wainuioru is part of the Whareama statistical area.

Education

Most students come from the surrounding rural area, but many come from Masterton.

References

Masterton District
Populated places in the Wellington Region